In enzymology, an agmatine N4-coumaroyltransferase is an enzyme that catalyzes the chemical reaction

4-coumaroyl-CoA + agmatine  CoA + N-(4-guanidinobutyl)-4-hydroxycinnamamide

Thus, the two substrates of this enzyme are 4-coumaroyl-CoA and agmatine, whereas its two products are CoA and N-(4-guanidinobutyl)-4-hydroxycinnamamide.

This enzyme belongs to the family of transferases, to be specific those acyltransferases transferring groups other than aminoacyl groups.  The systematic name of this enzyme class is 4-coumaroyl-CoA:agmatine N4-coumaroyltransferase. Other names in common use include p-coumaroyl-CoA-agmatine N-p-coumaroyltransferase, agmatine coumaroyltransferase, and 4-coumaroyl-CoA:agmatine 4-N-coumaroyltransferase.

References

 

EC 2.3.1
Enzymes of unknown structure